Diego Fernández (fl. 1020 –  1046), also known as Diego Fernández de Oviedo, was a member of one of the most noble lineages of the Kingdom of León as the son of Fernando Flaínez and Elvira Peláez, daughter of count Pelayo Rodríguez. He was the second cousin of King Ferdinand I since both shared the same great-grandfather, Count Fernando Bermúdez de Cea. Distinguished with the title of Count at an early age, Diego was the father of Jimena Díaz, wife of Rodrigo Díaz de Vivar El Cid.

Marriages and issue 
Count Diego first married Elvira Ovéquiz, daughter of Count Oveco Sánchez and Countess Elo, who gave him two daughters: 
 Onneca Mayor Díaz the wife of Gundemaro Iohannes (Ibáñez) 
 Aurovita Díaz, married to Munio Godestéiz,most probably the Muño Gustioz mentioned in the Cantar de Mio Cid who would have been the brother-in-law of Jimena Díaz who fought along with El Cid and accompanied Jimena during her widowhood.

His second wife, probably named Cristina, was a daughter of Fernando Gundemáriz and granddaughter of Gundemaro Pinióliz. The documented offspring of this marriage were:
 Rodrigo Díaz, count in Asturias, who, according to the charters in the Monastery of San Juan de Corias, could have married a Gontrodo with whom he had two daughters, Sancha a Mayor Rodríguez. 
 Fernando Díaz,  one of the most powerful magnates of his period, who first married Godo Gonzalez Salvadórez and then Enderquina Muñoz, daughter of Count Munio González.
 Jimena Díaz, the wife of El Cid.

Notes

References

Bibliography 
 
 

 

 

Counts of Asturias
10th-century people from the Kingdom of León
11th-century people from the Kingdom of León
1040s deaths
Year of birth unknown